Manuel Cárdenas Espitia (21 June 1961 – 14 July 1990) was a Colombian professional racing cyclist. He rode in the 1984 and 1986 Tour de France.

References

External links
 

1961 births
1990 deaths
Colombian male cyclists
Place of birth missing
Sportspeople from Boyacá Department
20th-century Colombian people